The WCT Arctic Cup (previously known as the Taimyr Cup, the CCT Arctic Cup and the Nornickel Curling Cup) is an annual bonspiel, or curling tournament, that takes place in late May at the Taimyr Ice Arena in Dudinka, Russia. The tournament is held in a Round Robin format. The tournament is part of the World Curling Tour. In 2016, the inaugural event was held between Russian men's teams. In 2017 and 2019 it was a women's event, and in 2018 and 2021 it was a mixed doubles event. In 2022, it was held in an open entry format where men's and women's teams competed against each other.

Men's champions

Women's champions

Mixed doubles champions

Open event champions

References

External links
Event Home Page

Champions Curling Tour events
Sport in Krasnoyarsk Krai
Curling competitions in Russia
World Curling Tour events